Allen C. Schmidt is an American former politician who served in the Kansas State Senate as a Democrat in 2011 and 2012.

Schmidt grew up on a dairy farm near Hays, Kansas, and is a fifth-generation farmer. He attended the University of Kansas and received a master's in school psychology from Fort Hays State University before joining the U.S. Army and receiving a second master's from the U.S. Army War College. He spent 32 years in the Army Service Medical Corps, retiring as a colonel.

In February 2011, Schmidt was appointed to the Kansas Senate to fill out the remaining term of Janis Lee, who had resigned upon being appointed to the Kansas Court of Tax Appeals. He chose not to stand for re-election in his own right, and in the 2012 elections the seat was taken by Republican Leslie Donovan.

After leaving the Senate, Schmidt opened a vineyard on his family's farm in 2017. He was appointed to the Kansas Board of Regents in 2019, and his term there ended on June 30, 2022.

References

Year of birth unknown
Living people
Kansas Board of Regents
Democratic Party Kansas state senators
Farmers from Kansas
American viticulturists
University of Kansas alumni
Fort Hays State University alumni
United States Army War College alumni
United States Army colonels
21st-century American politicians
Year of birth missing (living people)